The Extra Mile Education Foundation is a privately funded, non-profit charity 501(3)(c) based in Pittsburgh, Pennsylvania, founded in 1989. The money raised by the charity is used to subsidize the tuition of low income students who attend several K-8 Catholic schools in the Pittsburgh area. Most of the students are African American. As of January 2011, five Pittsburgh schools are currently enrolled in the program.

Statistics

A January 28, 2007 article in the Pittsburgh Post-Gazette cites the following information about The Extra Mile Education Foundation
 Of the 830 students whose education is funded by the program, most are non-Catholic.
 70% of the students come from families whose income is low enough to qualify for free or reduced priced lunches.
 Of the students who graduate from the program (i.e., from 8th grade),  not a single student has ever failed 9th grade, and 96% of the students graduate from high school within 4 years.
 The foundation spends $1.9 million per year for scholarships. The money comes from donations, and from interest on the foundation's $17 million endowment.

Mission statement

The following is an excerpt from their official mission statement: "Extra Mile Education Foundation supports the education of urban children in select Pittsburgh parochial elementary schools ... The schools – identified by the Diocese of Pittsburgh – are in economically disadvantaged neighborhoods, and students are primarily African American and non-Catholic. Extra Mile is dedicated to sustaining these schools for their communities on an ongoing basis..." The entire mission statement can be read on the Foundation website.

Donors
Donors include:
Heinz Endowments
 Westinghouse Electric

Board of directors
Notable members of the foundation's board include:
 Art Rooney II, President of the Pittsburgh Steelers
 Michael P. Tomlin, Head coach Pittsburgh Steelers
 David Shapira, Chairman and CEO of Giant Eagle
 Thomas Usher, former Chairman of Marathon Oil
 David Zubik, Bishop of Pittsburgh

Notes

African Americans and education
Educational charities based in the United States
Non-profit organizations based in Pittsburgh
Organizations established in 1989
Charities based in Pennsylvania